In computer networks, self-similarity is a feature of network data transfer dynamics. When modeling network data dynamics the traditional time series models, such as an autoregressive moving average model are not appropriate. This is because these models only provide a finite number of parameters in the model and thus interaction in a finite time window, but the network data usually have a long-range dependent temporal structure. A self-similar process is one way of modeling network data dynamics with such a long range correlation. This article defines and describes network data transfer dynamics in the context of a self-similar process. Properties of the process are shown and methods are given for  graphing and estimating parameters modeling the self-similarity of network data.

Definition 

Suppose  be a weakly stationary (2nd-order stationary) process
with mean , variance , and autocorrelation function .
Assume that the autocorrelation function  has the form
Let ,
where , denote an aggregated point series over non-overlapping blocks of size , for each  is a positive integer.

Exactly self-similar process 

Definition:Fractional Gaussian Noise (FGN) 
 is called the Fractional Gaussian Noise, where  is a Fractional Brownian motion.

exactly second order self-similar process 

asymptotic second order self-similar process 

Some relative situations of Self-Similar Processes

Long-Range-Dependence(LRD) 
Suppose  be a weakly stationary (2nd-order stationary) process with mean  and variance . The Autocorrelation Function (ACF) of lag  is given by 
Definition:
A weakly stationary process is said to be "Long-Range-Dependence" if 

The spectral density function of long-range dependence follows a power law near the origin.

also see

Slowly decaying variances 

Estimating the self-similarity parameter "H"

R/S analysis 
Assume that the underlying process  is Fractional Gaussian Noise. Consider the series , and let .
Definition:R/S statistic

If  is FGN, then 
Consider fitting a regression model :
, where

In particular for a time series of length  divide the time series data into  groups each of size , compute  for each group.
Thus for each n we have  pairs of data.There are  points for each , so we can fit a regression model to estimate  more accurately. If the slope of the regression line is between 0.5~1, it is a self-similar process.

Variance-time plot 
For estimating H, calculate sample means  for  sub-series of length .
The variance-time plots are obtained by plotting  against
 and we can fit a simple least square line through the resulting points in the plane ignoring the small values of k.

Self-similarity can be inferred from the values of the estimated slope which is asymptotically between –1 and 0, and an estimate for the degree of self-similarity is given by

Periodogram-based analysis 

It is not only a tool for visualizing the Hurst's parameter, but also a method to do some statistical inference about the parameters via the asymptotic properties of the MLE. In particular,  follows a Gaussian process.
, where

Thus, the Whittle's estimator  of  minimizes
the function 
These integrations can be assessed by Riemann sum.

Then  asymptotically follows a normal distribution if  can be expressed as a form of an infinite moving average model.

To estimate , first, one has to calculate this periodogram. Since
 is an estimator of the spectral density, a series with long-range dependence should have a periodogram, which is proportional to  close to the origin. The periodogram plot is obtained by plotting
 against .
Thus, the estimation  is obtained.

Note:
There are two common problems when we apply the periodogram method. First, if the data does not follow a Gaussian distribution, transformation of the data can solve this kind of problems. Second, the sample spectrum which deviates from the assumed spectral density is another one. An aggregation method is suggested to solve this problem.

References 
 P. Whittle, "Estimation and information in stationary time series", Art. Mat. 2, 423-434, 1953.
 K. PARK, W. WILLINGER, Self-Similar Network Traffic and Performance Evaluation, WILEY,2000.
 W. E. Leland, W. Willinger, M. S. Taqqu, D. V. Wilson, "On the self-similar nature of Ethernet traffic", ACM SIGCOMM Computer Communication Review 25,202-213,1995.
 W. Willinger, M. S. Taqqu, W. E. Leland, D. V. Wilson, "Self-Similarity in High-Speed Packet Traffic: Analysis and Modeling of Ethernet Traffic Measurements", Statistical Science 10,67-85,1995.

Computer network analysis